Acharya Prafulla Chandra College, established in 1960, in West Bengal, India. It is affiliated West Bengal State University. The college is awarded grade "A" by National Assessment and Accreditation Council (NAAC).

Departments

The college has the following departments, offering Under graduate degree(Honours and general) :

The college also offers Post-graduation degree in following departments :

Arts

 Bengali
 History

Science

 Chemistry
 Computer Science
 Electronic Science
 Mathematics
 Microbiology
 Physics

Accreditation
The college is recognised by NAAC and UGC.

See also
Education in India
List of colleges in West Bengal
Education in West Bengal

References

External links
Official website

Educational institutions established in 1960
Colleges affiliated to West Bengal State University
Universities and colleges in North 24 Parganas district
1960 establishments in West Bengal